is a Japanese former Nippon Professional Baseball pitcher.

References 

1969 births
Living people
Baseball people from Aichi Prefecture 
Asia University (Japan) alumni
Japanese baseball players
Nippon Professional Baseball pitchers
Kintetsu Buffaloes players
Osaka Kintetsu Buffaloes players
Chunichi Dragons players
Tohoku Rakuten Golden Eagles players